Sirkka Tellervo "Telle" Polkunen (later Vilander, 6 November 1927 – 28 September 2014),  was a Finnish cross-country skier who competed at the 1952 and 1956 Olympics. She won a gold medal in the 3 × 5 km relay in 1956 and placed fifth and eighth in the individual 10 km event in 1952 and 1956, respectively. Polkunen also won a silver medal in the 3 × 5 km relay at the 1954 FIS Nordic World Ski Championships and finished sixth in the 10 km at those championships.

Polkunen never won a national title, placing second-third over 10 km in 1951, 1953–54 and 1956. She worked as a loader and packer at the Vihtavuori gunpowder factory, and retired from competitions in 1957.

Cross-country skiing results
All results are sourced from the International Ski Federation (FIS).

Olympic Games
 1 medal – (1 gold)

World Championships
 1 medal – (1 silver)

References

External links

 
 

1927 births
2014 deaths
Sportspeople from Jyväskylä
Finnish female cross-country skiers
Olympic cross-country skiers of Finland
Cross-country skiers at the 1952 Winter Olympics
Cross-country skiers at the 1956 Winter Olympics
Olympic gold medalists for Finland
Olympic medalists in cross-country skiing
FIS Nordic World Ski Championships medalists in cross-country skiing
Medalists at the 1956 Winter Olympics
20th-century Finnish women